John Dunkel (February 21, 1915 – February 22, 2001) was an American screenwriter. In the 1930s he wrote for CBS Radio in Hollywood, California. Dunkel wrote for television programs including Gunsmoke, Bonanza, The Life and Legend of Wyatt Earp, Wagon Train, The Californians, The Virginian, Laramie, The Big Valley and Rawhide. He died in February 2001 of a heart attack in Los Angeles, California, at the age of 86.

References

External links 

1915 births
2001 deaths
People from Springfield, Ohio
Screenwriters from Ohio
American radio writers
American male screenwriters
American television writers
American male television writers
20th-century American male writers
20th-century American screenwriters
Wittenberg University alumni